Thomas and Mary Hogan House is a historic home located near Carrboro, Orange County, North Carolina.  It was built about 1860, as a -story, Greek Revival style frame dwelling.  It was enlarged to two-stories and updated with Queen Anne style design elements about 1890.  The farmhouse is sheathed in plain weatherboard, has a gable-and-wing form, one gable end brick chimney, one interior brick chimney, and a one-story wraparound porch.

It was listed on the National Register of Historic Places in 2001.

References

Houses on the National Register of Historic Places in North Carolina
Greek Revival houses in North Carolina
Queen Anne architecture in North Carolina
Houses completed in 1890
Buildings and structures in Chapel Hill-Carrboro, North Carolina
National Register of Historic Places in Orange County, North Carolina